The Bulgarian Stock Exchange (Balgarska fondova borsa, abbreviated BSE) is a stock exchange operating in Sofia, the capital of Bulgaria. It was founded as First Bulgarian Stock Exchange on 10 October 1991 as a joint stock company.

As of May 2010, the Bulgarian Stock Exchange is 44% owned by the Bulgarian government, which is looking for potential worldwide investors, some of them being the Frankfurt Stock Exchange, Athens Stock Exchange, OMX, and the Prague Stock Exchange.

History 
The original successor called the Sofia Stock Exchange which had been established through a tsar's decree, ceased to operate after the Second World War as Bulgaria became a communist state.

In January 2011, the stock exchange (stock symbol: BSO) was officially added to the regular market trading.

As of November 2011, the total market capitalization of the Bulgarian Stock Exchange is around US$8.5 billion. The exchange has pre-market sessions from 9:00 am to 9:20 am, normal trading sessions from 9:20 am to 1:45 pm and post-market sessions from 1:45 pm to 4:00 pm on all days of the week except Saturdays, Sundays and holidays declared by the exchange in advance.

In June 2018, the name of the stock exchange was changed from 'Bulgarian Stock Exchange - Sofia' to just 'Bulgarian Stock Exchange'.

Indices 

The Bulgarian Stock Exchange publishes the following indices:
 SOFIX
 BG40
 BGTR30
 BGREIT

The Bulgarian Stock Exchange is a member of the Federation of Euro-Asian Stock Exchanges.

References

External links

  

Financial services companies established in 1991
Stock exchanges in Europe
Economy of Bulgaria
Companies based in Sofia
Bulgarian companies established in 1991